Dinabad (also Romanized as Dīnābād; also known as Dīnābād Kūh) is a village in Kuh Shah Rural District, Ahmadi District, Hajjiabad County, Hormozgan Province, Iran. At the 2006 census, its population was 59, in 16 families.

References 

Populated places in Hajjiabad County